Mazacyla is a genus of moths of the family Erebidae. The genus was erected by Francis Walker in 1865.

The Global Lepidoptera Names Index considers this name to be a synonym of Mecodinops Hampson, 1926.

Species
Mazacyla fusifera Walker, 1865 Brazil (Rio de Janeiro)
Mazacyla lilacina (Felder & Rogenhofer, 1874) Brazil (Amazonas)
Mazacyla relata (Walker, 1858) Suriname, Brazil (Amazonas)
Mazacyla subpicta Schaus, 1911 Costa Rica

References

Calpinae